Seung-yong is a Korean unisex given name. Its meaning differs based on the hanja used to write each syllable of the name.

Hanja
There are 15 hanja with the reading "seung" and 24 hanja with the reading "yong" on the South Korean government's official list of hanja which may be registered for use in given names. Additionally, there is one character with the reading "ryong" which may also be written and pronounced "yong" in South Korea. Some ways of writing this name in hanja include:

 (오를 승, 용 용), also spelled Seung-ryong, meaning "rising dragon"
 (이길 승, 용 용), also spelled Seung-ryong, meaning "victorious dragon"
 (오를 승, 날랠 용), meaning "rising bravery"

People
People with this name include:
Nam Sung-yong (1912–2001), Korean male marathon runner of the Japanese colonial period
Seung-Yong Seong (born 1964/1965), South Korean immunologist and microbiologist
Lee Seung-yong (born 1970), South Korean male fencer
Choi Seung-yong (born 1980), South Korean female speed skater
Kim Seung-yong (born 1985), South Korean male footballer
Jung Seung-yong (born 1991), South Korean male footballer

See also
List of Korean given names

References

Korean unisex given names